Christopher Sainato (born May 8, 1959) is an American politician who represented the 9th District in the Pennsylvania House of Representatives from 1995 to 2022. He is a member of the Democratic Party.

Early life and education
Sainato was born on May 8, 1959 in New Castle, Pennsylvania. He graduated from Union Area High School in 1977, and earned a Bachelor of Science degree from Youngstown State University in 1982.

Political career
From 1983 to 1993, Sainato served as a aide to Congressman Joe Kolter.

Pennsylvania House of Representatives
In 1994, Sainato was elected to represent the 9th District in the Pennsylvania House of Representatives.
Sainato was re-elected thirteen times; facing a Republican challenger on only a few occasions. In 2022, Sainato was defeated for re-election by Republican Marla Brown.

References

External links
Pennsylvania House of Representatives - Chris Sainato official PA House website
Project Vote Smart - Representative Chris Sainato (PA) profile
Follow the Money - Chris Sainato
2006 2004 2002 2000 1998 campaign contributions
Pennsylvania House Democratic Caucus - Rep. Christopher Sainato official Party website

Democratic Party members of the Pennsylvania House of Representatives
1959 births
Living people
21st-century American politicians
20th-century American politicians
Youngstown State University alumni